Otoyol 21A, abbreviated as O-21A, is a  long auxiliary otoyol connecting the D.330 and D.750 to the O-21. The motorway was opened in 1992 as a connecting route to Konya and passes through mostly uninhabited rural land. The O-21A is a part of the E90. 

The motorway was deemed too short to receive its own O-XX designation, despite being longer than the O-50, but too long to be designated as an exit; therefore, the route was signed as the O-21A, and is the only otoyol route in Turkey to have an alpha-numeric route designation.

Exit list

Light blue indicates toll section of motorway.

See also
 List of highways in Turkey

External links
Mersin Diyarbakır road map

Transport in Niğde Province
21A